Preis may refer to:
 Alfred Preis (1911–1993), Austrian architect
 Ellen Preis (Ellen Müller-Preis) (1912–2007), German-born Austrian Olympic champion foil fencer
 Mary Louise Preis (b. 1941), US politician
 Phil Preis (born 1950), Louisiana attorney and former gubernatorial candidate
 Alexander Preys (1905–1942), Russian playwright

See also
 Preiss
 Price
 Award (disambiguation)

German-language surnames
Jewish surnames